The Ministry of Finance is a governmental agency within the Cabinet of Georgia in charge of regulating the financial sector in the Republic of Georgia. Lasha Khutsishvili has served as the Minister since 1 April 2021.

Structure
Main functions of the ministry is regulation of financial sector by ensuring sustainable economic development and financial stability; enforcing state policies on financial issues, budgeting and taxes; ensuring stability of state finances and development of financial markets in the country; attracting foreign creditors to Georgian economy; improvement of budgeting, tax forecasting, financial mechanisms; ensuring financial control over budgetary funds and spending; treasury development, revenue mobilization, provision of state budget funds management and controlling movement of funds within Georgia.

List of Ministers of Finance
 Guram Absandze, November 1990 – January 1992
 Parnaoz Ananiashvili, January 1992 – September 1993
 David Iakobidze, September 1993 – April 1997
 Mikheil Chkuaseli, May 1997 – November 1998
 David Onoprishvili, November 1998 – May 2000
 Zurab Noghaideli, May 2000 – November 2001
 Mirian Gogiashvili, November 2001 – November 2003
 Zurab Noghaideli, November 2003 – February 2005
 Valeriy Chechelashvili, February 2005 – June 2005
 Lekso Aleksishvili, June 2005 – August 2007
 Nika Gilauri, August 30, 2007 – February 6, 2009
 Kakha Baindurashvili, February 6, 2009 – June 17, 2011
 Dimitri Gvindadze, June 20, 2011 – August 13, 2012
 Alexander Khetaguri, August 13, 2012 – October 25, 2012
 Nodar Khaduri, October 25, 2012 – November 2016  
 Dimitry Kumsishvili, November 22, 2016 – 13 November 2017
 Mamuka Bakhtadze, 13 November 2017 – 13 June 2018
 Nikoloz Gagua, 21 June 2018 – 12 July 2018
 Ivane Matchavariani, 12 July 2018 – 31 March 2021
 Lasha Khutsishvili, 1 April 2021 – Present

See also
Cabinet of Georgia

References

Finance
Georgia
Economy of Georgia (country)

1992 establishments in Georgia (country)
Georgia, Finance